Počátky is a town in Pelhřimov District in the Vysočina Region of the Czech Republic. It has about 2,500 inhabitants. It is situated on both sides of the historical Bohemian-Moravian border. The historic town centre is well preserved and is protected by law as an urban monument zone.

Administrative parts
Villages of Heřmaneč, Horní Vilímeč, Léskovec, Prostý and Vesce are administrative parts of Počátky.

Etymology
In the area there are springs of many watercourses. The name Počátky (literally "beginnings") refers to the beginnings of rivers.

Geography

The municipal territory lies on the border between Bohemia and Moravia. Bohemian part includes Heřmaneč, Léskovec and Počátky with the exception of agro-forest lands in the south. The Moravian part consists of Prostý, Vesce and the bigger part of Horní Vilímeč.

The Počátecký Stream flows through the town. The area is rich in ponds, the largest one is Velký Klátů Pond. Tovární Pond is located in the urban area.

Along the road from Počátky to Kaliště, the longest larch alley in the country is planted. It was founded in the early 20th century and includes 280 trees.

History
Due to the higher altitude, the first settlement was established no earlier than in the second half of the 13th century. The first written mention of Počátky is from 1289. It was originally a market village. The first known owner was Vítek of Švábenice who acquired it by marrying Perchta of Kralovany. In 1389, Počátky was bought by Lords of Hradec. During the Hussite Wars, the town gained the right to build stone walls.

The economical development occurred during the industrialization in the second half of the 19th century. Some of the factories have remained in operation to this day. In the early 20th century, Svatá Kateřina Spa with a healing spring was established and Počátky became a tourist centre.

Education
In Počátky there is a facility with regional significance which comprises educational institute for girls with behavioral problems, children's home with school, high school and primary school. There is also a kindergarten and Otokar Březina Elementary School with local significance.

Culture
In 2011, the former cinema building was reconstructed into a multifunctional complex, which houses a town library, a hall used as a cinema or theatre, a gallery, a meeting place for volunteer associations and a town information centre.

Sights

Počátky has preserved historic centre with several small squares. The main and the largest square is Palackého Square. It is lined by valuable burgher houses. Its landmark is the Church of St. John the Baptist with an accessible tower. In the middle of the square is a fountain with a sculpture of St. John of Nepomuk.

On the square there is also the Town Museum with ethnographic and numismatic collections. It was founded in 1892 and is the oldest museum in the region. The museum also manages the Otokar Březina birth house with an exposition on life and work of the most famous native.

Other sights in the town include the cemetery Church of Corpus Christi, baroquely rebuilt in 1705–1711, or Church of Saint Catherine near the healing spring.

In popular culture
Some of the scenes of the films and TV series Cutting It Short (1980), Návštěvníci (1983) and The Ride (1994) were shot here.

Notable people
Otokar Březina (1868–1929), poet and essayist
Vítězslav Novák (1870–1949), composer; lived here in 1872–1882
Miloš Tichý (born 1966), astronomer
Jaroslav Drobný (born 1979), footballer

Twin towns – sister cities

Počátky is twinned with:
 Konolfingen, Switzerland
 Lokca, Slovakia

Trivia
The asteroid 14974 Počátky was named after the town by its discoverer Miloš Tichý, a native of Počátky.

Gallery

References

External links

Cities and towns in the Czech Republic
Populated places in Pelhřimov District